The 2014 Cork Premier Intermediate Hurling Championship was the 11th staging of the Cork Premier Intermediate Hurling Championship since its establishment by the Cork County Board in 2004.  The draw for the opening round of the championship took place at the County Convention on 15 December 2013. The championship began on 24 May 2014 and ended on 12 October 2014.

On 16 August 2014, Kilbrittain were relegated from the championship following a 1-16 to 1-22 defeat by Watergrasshill.

On 12 October 2014, Ballyhea won the championship following a 1-17 to 0-16 defeat of Newcestown in the final. This remains their only championship title in the grade.

Kilworth's Adrian Mannix was the championship's top scorer with 0-43.

Teams

A total of 16 teams contested the Premier Intermediate Championship, including 14 teams from the 2013 premier intermediate championship, one relegated from the 2013 senior championship and one promoted from the 2013 intermediate championship.

Team changes

To Championship

Promoted from the Cork Intermediate Hurling Championship
 Kanturk

Relegated from the Cork Senior Hurling Championship
 Ballinhassig

From Championship

Promoted to the Cork Senior Hurling Championship
 Youghal

Relegated to the Cork Intermediate Hurling Championship
 Ballincollig

Results

Round 1

Round 2

Round 3

Relegation play-off

Round 4

Quarter-final

Semi-final

Final

Championship statistics

Scoring events

Widest winning margin: 13 points
Cloyne 3-17 – 0-13 Valley Rovers (Round 1)
Valley Rovers 2-17 – 1-07 Kilbrittain (Round 2)
Newcestown 2-22 – 1-12 Carrigaline (Round 4)
Most goals in a match: 5
Carrigaline 3-15 – 2-16 Kilworth (Round 1)
Inniscarra 4-19 – 1-24 Watergrasshill (Round 2)
Cloyne 4-14 – 1-15 Bandon (Round 4)
Most points in a match: 46
Kanturk 1-24 – 0-22 Blarney (Round 1)
Most goals by one team in a match: 4
Inniscarra 4-19 – 1-24 Watergrasshill (Round 2)
Cloyne 4-14 – 1-15 Bandon (Round 4)
Most goals scored by a losing team: 2
Mallow 2-10 – 1-25 Ballyhea (Round 1)
Tracton 2-18 – 2-19 Ballinhassig (Round 1)
Kilworth 2-16 – 3-15 Carrigaline (Round 1)
Kilworth 2-12 – 2-13 Mallow (Round 2)
Tracton 2-13 – 1-18 Kanturk (Round 4)
Cloyne 2-10 – 0-18 Ballyhea (Semi-final)
Most points scored by a losing team: 24 
Watergrasshill 1-24 – 4-19 Inniscarra (Round 2)

Top scorers

Top scorer overall

Top scorers in a single game

Miscellaneous

 As a result of winning the championship title, Ballyhea gained promotion to the Cork Senior Hurling Championship for the first time since 2003.

References

External links

 2-14 Cork PIHC results

Cork Premier Intermediate Hurling Championship
Cork Premier Intermediate Hurling Championship